Otto A. Stangel (March 23, 1889 – March 29, 1956), a native of Two Rivers, Wisconsin, was an NCAA Men's Basketball All-American basketball player at the University of Wisconsin–Madison in 1911–12. He led the Big Ten Conference in scoring with 177 points, a record which stood for eight years. The Badgers went undefeated in 1911–12 at 15–0 and were named co-Big Ten champions as well as retroactively-named national champions by the Helms Athletic Foundation. Helms also named Stangel an All-American in 1912.

Stangel was later the superintendent of farms at Delaware Valley University and the school's football coach in 1923.

References

Additional sources

External links
 

1889 births
1956 deaths
All-American college men's basketball players
Basketball players from Wisconsin
Delaware Valley Aggies football coaches
Forwards (basketball)
People from Two Rivers, Wisconsin
Wisconsin Badgers men's basketball players
American men's basketball players